The 1996 UEFA Intertoto Cup finals were won by Silkeborg, En Avant Guingamp, and Karlsruher SC. All three teams advanced to the UEFA Cup. No English team took part in support of Tottenham Hotspur and Wimbledon initially getting banned by UEFA from European competition, after both fielded under-strength sides in the previous year's competition.

Qualified teams

Group stage

Group 1

Group 2

Group 3

Group 4

Group 5

Group 6

Group 7

Group 8

Group 9

Group 10

Group 11

Group 12

Semi-finals

First leg

Second leg

Segesta won 5–4 on aggregate.

2–2 on aggregate, Silkeborg won on away goals rule.

Guingamp won 4–2 on aggregate.

Rotor Volgograd won 7–2 on aggregate.

Standard Liège won 3–1 on aggregate.

Karlsruhe won 5–2 on aggregate.

Finals

First leg

Second leg

Karlsruhe won 3–2 on aggregate.

2–2 on aggregate, Silkeborg won on away goals rule.

2–2 on aggregate, Guingamp won on away goals rule.

See also
1996–97 UEFA Champions League
1996–97 UEFA Cup Winners' Cup
1996–97 UEFA Cup

References

External links
Official site
Results at RSSSF

UEFA Intertoto Cup
4